

Arthropods

Newly named insects

Fish

Non-dinosaurian reptiles

Dinosaurs

Laelaps trihedrodon, Cope criticizes Dryptosaurus
O. W. Lucas collected the first remains of what would later in the year be named Laelaps trihedrodon from Quarry I of the Saurian Hill at Garden Park, Colorado. Edward Drinker Cope would describe the material later in the year in a short paper titled "On a carnivorous dinosaurian from the Dakota beds of Colorado." The "Dakota beds" he references are actually Morrison Formation strata. Cope claims to have a skeleton of unspecified completeness on which to establish the new species, but only describes a partial dentary which has 5 successional teeth, 2 functional teeth, and one tooth missing from its socket. All of the preceding material has since been lost to science with the exception of 5 broken, partial tooth crowns. From the now missing dentary, Cope infers that the creature is a carnivore and compares its dentition to that belonging to other members of his infamous genus "Laelaps", L. aquilunguis and L. incrassatus. Cope concludes the paper with a pointed criticism of his rival O. C. Marsh's attempt to rename Laelaps as the genus Dryptosaurus because the generic name Laelaps has been used in entomology. Cope claims that since the mite genus Laelaps was a synonym that the name was not truly preoccupied and Marsh's erection of Dryptosaurus has therefore created a new, redundant synonym of Laelaps the dinosaur. However, subsequent researchers have supported Marsh's new name.

Apatosaurus
 Apatosaurus specimen found with preserved gastroliths.

New genera

Synapsids

Non-mammalian

See also

 1877 in science

Footnotes

References
 Cannon, G.L. (1907). Sauropodan gastroliths. Science 24, 116.
 
 Cope, E.D. (1877). On a carnivorous dinosaurian from the Dakota beds of Colorado. Bull. U.S. Geol. Surv. Territories 3: 805–806.
 Sanders F, Manley K, Carpenter K. Gastroliths from the Lower Cretaceous sauropod Cedarosaurus weiskopfae. In: Tanke D.H, Carpenter K, editors. Mesozoic vertebrate life: new research inspired by the paleontology of Philip J. Currie. Indiana University Press; Bloomington, IN: 2001. pp. 166–180.

1870s in paleontology
Paleontology, 1877 In